The 1904–05 City Cup was the eleventh edition of the City Cup, a cup competition in Irish football.

The tournament was won by Distillery for the first time.

Group standings

References

1904–05 in Irish association football